The Bread Peddler (French: La porteuse de pain) is a 1934 French drama film directed by René Sti and starring Germaine Dermoz, Jacques Grétillat and Simone Bourday. It is based on Xavier de Montépin's novel of the same title.

The film's sets were designed by Eugène Lourié.

Cast
 Germaine Dermoz as Jeanne Fortier  
 Jacques Grétillat as Garaud  
 Simone Bourday as Louise  
 Fernandel as Billenbuis  
 Mona Goya as Mary 
 Madeleine Guitty as Rose  
 Jeanne Marie-Laurent as Madame Darrier  
 François Rozet as Lucien Labroue  
 Samson Fainsilber as Castel  
 Roger Dann as Georges Darrier  
 Georges Paulais as L'avocat général  
 Paul Clerget as L'abbé Laugier 
 Alexandre Dréan as Cricri  
 Daniel Mendaille as Soliveau  
 Claude Borelli as Un petit garçon

References

Bibliography 
 Goble, Alan. The Complete Index to Literary Sources in Film. Walter de Gruyter, 1999.

External links 
 

1934 drama films
French drama films
1934 films
1930s French-language films
Films based on The Bread Peddler
French black-and-white films
1930s French films